Spike directivity  is a vector that quantifies changes in transient charge density  during action potential propagation.

The digital-like uniformity of action potentials is contradicted by experimental data. Electrophysiologists have observed that the shape of recorded action potentials changes in time. Recent experimental evidence has shown that action potentials in neurons are subject to waveform modulation while they travel down axons or dendrites. The action potential waveform can be modulated by neuron geometry, local alterations in the ion conductance, and other  biophysical properties including neurotransmitter release.

See also 
 Cellular neuroscience
 Neuron
 NeuroElectroDynamics

References 

Neural coding
Electrophysiology
Computational neuroscience
Cellular neuroscience